The Rzehakinidae is a family of Lower Cretaceous to recent formaminifera that resemble the calcareous imperforate Miliolidae but which are constructed of finely agglutinated material that veneers an organic base. Tests are with two, or less commonly three, chambers per whorl, which are commonly added in various planes. In form they are generally ovoid.

The Rzehakinidae was included in the Lituolacea, (Textulariina) in the Treatise Part C, 1964, and removed by Loeblich and Tappan, 1982 to its own superfamily, the Rzehakinacea. Eleven genera are included:
Rzehakina
Ammoflintina
Birsteiniolla
Miliammina
Psamminopelta
Rothina
Silicomassilina
Silicosigmoilina
Spirolocammina
Spirosigmoilinella
Trilocularena

References

 Alfred R. Loeblich Jr and Helen Tappan, 1964. Sarcodina Chiefly "Thecamoebians" and Foraminiferida; Treatise on Invertebrate Paleontology, Part C Protista 2. Geological Society of America and University of Kansas Press.
 Alfred R. Loeblich Jr and Helen Tappan,1988. Forminiferal Genera and their Classification. Van Nostrand Reinhold. Foraminiferida

Foraminifera families